profil is an Austrian weekly news magazine  published in German and based in Vienna. It has been in circulation since 1970. The magazine is sometimes considered the Austrian counterpart to Der Spiegel.

History and profile
profil was founded in 1970 by Oscar Bronner, who also founded the magazine trend and the daily newspaper Der Standard. The magazine is headquartered in Vienna.

The first edition of profil came out as a monthly on 7 September 1970. Starting in October 1972, it was published every two weeks and from January 1974 every week. In 2001 profil became part of the publishing company NEWS. In 1975 business magazine, ecco, merged with profil.

profil includes sections for Austria, abroad, economy, society, science, and culture. Glosses, caricatures, and letters to the editor are also published. In the mid-1980s it had an independent and liberal leaning. In the 2000s the magazine had a left liberal political stance. It targets Austria's intelligentsia. Both profil and trend initiated investigative journalism in the country. It was profil which revealed the Nazi past of Kurt Waldheim, former Austrian president.

Christian Rainer has been publisher and editor-in-chief since 1998 when he succeeded Josef Votzi in the post. The chief editorial staff consists of Sven Gächter, Stefan Janny, and Herbert Lackner. 

Investigative journalist Hubertus Czernin served as the political editor of profil. He uncovered the story about Kurt Waldheim's Nazi connection.

In January 2023 Richard Grasl became managing director of the magazine.

Circulation
The circulation of profil was 72,000 copies in 1985. In 1993, the magazine had a circulation of more than 100,000 copies.

The weekly had a circulation of 76,000 copies in 2003 and 78,000 copies in the first quarter of 2004. In 2006, the magazine had a readership of 6%, being second to NEWS magazine. The circulation of the magazine was 251,000 copies in 2007. Its circulation for the first half of 2008 was 59,124 copies. The 2010 circulation of profil was 93,000 copies. The circulation of the magazine during the first half of 2013 was 71,033 copies.

See also
List of magazines in Austria

References

External links
Official website 

1970 establishments in Austria
Biweekly magazines
German-language magazines
Magazines established in 1970
Magazines published in Vienna
Monthly magazines published in Austria
News magazines published in Europe
Weekly magazines published in Austria
Weekly news magazines